XHTVL-TDT (channel 13) is a television station in Villahermosa, Tabasco, Mexico, the flagship station of the Canal 13 regional network owned by Albavisión.

Established in 1980, XHTVL was the first station in Mexico owned by Remigio Ángel González. It was a regional affiliate partner of Televisa until 2018, in the wake of the progressive disaffiliation of Televisa from its local stations and Albavisión's expansion plans to build a semi-national network.

History

XHTVL's concession was awarded on 23 April 1980. The station broadcast on analog channel 9. At the time, Tele-Emisoras del Sureste was owned by Remigio Ángel González, a Mexican-born entrepreneur who would later accumulate media holdings elsewhere in Latin America, as well as radio station owner Francisco Javier Sánchez Campuzano and Manuel Efraín Abán Méndez, who had placed the winning application for the frequency in 1979, beating out Jorge Kanahuati Gómez and Fernando Laurencio Pazos de la Torre. In 1987, Sánchez Campuzano exited the partnership, as well as his stake in Comunicación del Sureste, a parallel company that owned XHDY and XHGK television in Chiapas.

Regional expansion began not long after. On 24 April 1984, Abán Méndez received the concession for XHTOE-TV channel 12 in Tenosique, which would repeat XHTVL's programming in the southeastern region of Tabasco. In 1993, XHTOE's concession was transferred to Tele-Emisoras del Sureste. In 1985, the Patronato para Instalar Repetidoras de Canales de Televisión de Coatzacoalcos, Veracruz, A.C., a noncommercial group, obtained the permit for XHCVP-TV channel 9 in that city. XHCVP, while a social station, operates as a repeater of XHTVL, and in 2016, it was legally represented by lawyers associated with Albavisión.

XHTVL maintained a partnership with Televisa and carried programming from its Gala TV and Foro TV, and as a Televisa partner, Tele-Emisoras del Sureste is defined as within the "preponderant economic agent" in broadcasting for regulatory purposes. In 2014, XHTVL sourced 82 percent of its broadcast day from Televisa. In 2018, simultaneous events prompted XHTVL to disaffiliate from Televisa. One was the unwinding of many local relationships as Televisa began to multiplex Gala TV and Foro TV on subchannels of its own TV stations in some areas of the country where said programming had been broadcast on a local station, including Villahermosa. Another was the successful participation of Telsusa Televisión México, S.A. de C.V., a company also controlled by Remigio Ángel González, in the IFT-6 television station auction, in which it acquired TV stations in twelve cities primarily in southern and eastern Mexico. In March 2020, the IFT approved an application by Tele-Emisoras del Sureste to be removed from the preponderant economic agent.

On 18 October 2018, XHTVL and XHTOE, as well as their sister stations in Chiapas, moved to virtual channel 13. XHCVP-TDT was not authorized until 15 August 2019 to move to channel 13.

Programming
XHTVL produces Notinueve local newscasts, considered the most important in Tabasco television by media publication Etcétera, which air at 7:30 a.m., 3 p.m. and 9 p.m. Among the most notable on-air personalities of the station was Juan Carlos Huerta, who anchored the late edition of Notinueve. Huerta, a journalist who also hosted a radio show and founded XEGMSR-AM radio, was murdered in a robbery in May 2018.

Weekends are taken up by older Mexican movies.

Repeaters
XHTVL-TDT has two satellite stations, one of which has a repeater of its own:

References

Television stations in Tabasco
Television channels and stations established in 1980
1980 establishments in Mexico